Eastern Passage is an unincorporated suburban community in Halifax Regional Municipality Nova Scotia, Canada.

Eastern Passage has historically been tied to the fishing industry. Its waterfront has several small wharves and piers.  The construction of CFB Shearwater, a military air base, at the northern boundary of the community during World War I, and the construction of the Imperial Oil (later Esso), Texaco (later Ultramar) oil refineries, the Volvo Halifax Assembly plant and automobile import/export facility following World War II redefined the local economy.  New highway connections have resulted in the majority of area residents commuting to Downtown Halifax or Dartmouth.

History
Prior to the European settlers, Eastern Passage was a season home to the Mi'kmaq for thousands of years. Europeans began seasonal use of the channel starting about 1712 while the Mi'kmaq shifted to McNab's island.  The Eastern Passage area was granted to ranger Joseph Gorham, but he did not settle the passage and the land was regranted in 1798 to Jacob Horn, the first recorded settler who was soon followed by other families. The first European settlers who moved there were mainly German, French, Irish and English. These ethnic groups continue to make up a large portion of the population of Eastern Passage.

Fort Clarence (formerly the Eastern Battery), a large gun battery was constructed beside Eastern Passage in 1754 at the beginning of the French and Indian War.  Built to defend the harbour, the battery provided a cross fire with batteries on Georges Island and McNabs Island.  In the late 1790s a Martello Tower was built at each of the three sites.

During the American Civil War, The iron Confederate naval cruiser Tallahassee sailed into Halifax Harbour on August 18, 1864 to take on bunker coal and water and then used the Eastern Passage channel to escape, for it was believed that Union naval forces were waiting at the main harbour entrance.

An American naval air station was constructed at Eastern Passage during World War I to patrol against German submarines. It was taken over by the Royal Canadian Air Force in the 1920s and became a large air base during World War II.

In the 1920s and 1930s, a number of Eastern Passage residents from the Hartlan and Henneberry families proved important sources of Canadian folk songs and stories to Nova Scotia folklorist Helen Creighton.

During the second world war Hartlen's Point was bought out in order to build a military complex at the mouth of the harbor. This complex was called the Devil's Battery and is located underground.

Serious reductions to the CFB Shearwater base in the 1990s and the shutdown of the Ultramar Refinery challenged the economy of Eastern Passage in the 1990s. One response was the redevelopment of the small craft harbor, long known as "the Crick" or "the cove" but rechristened in 1996 as "Fisherman's Cove", a tourist attraction which combines a working fishing harbour with gift shops and restaurants.

In 1996 Fisherman's Cove opened as a tourist attraction. The attraction had things such as shops and restaurants.

In the summer of 2003, the fourth season of Trailer Park Boys was filmed in Eastern Passage. It was the last season of the show filmed in a privately held park.

Geography
Located at the southeastern edge of Halifax Harbour, fronting the Atlantic Ocean, Eastern Passage derives its name from the narrow strait separating the mainland from Lawlor Island and McNabs Island, both of which lie several hundred metres west of the community.  This "Eastern Passage" into the harbour is not the main shipping channel due to its shallow depths; the main shipping channel lies west of McNabs Island.  The Eastern Passage is largely used by small recreational boats and fishing vessels during inclement weather as the island affords shelter from prevailing winds.

The community is south--south-west of Cow Bay, and south-east of Shearwater, and has 1,372 hectares (13.72 km2) of landmass.

Schools

Ocean View Elementary School
Type: Elementary
Grades: Primary to 3
Constructed: 1954
Current Square Footage: .
Website: http://www.oves.ednet.ns.ca/

Horizon Elementary School
Type: Elementary
Grades: Primary to 3, including French Immersion
Constructed: 1991
Current Square Footage: .
Website: https://hes.hrce.ca/
Whether elementary students attend Ocean View or Horizon is dependent on where they live in the respective school's catchment area, or if they are enrolled in the French Immersion program.

Seaside Elementary
Type: SR. Elementary
Grades: 4, 5
Constructed: 1974 (opened as Eastern Passage Junior High School)
Current Square Footage: .
Website: http://ses.hrsb.ca/

Eastern Passage Education Centre
Type: Junior High
Grades: 6 to 8
Constructed: 1999
Current Square Footage: .
Website: https://web.archive.org/web/20170118042707/http://epe.hrsb.ca/

Island View High School
 Type: High School
 Grades: 9 to 12
 Constructed: 2018
 Current Square Footage: 78,575 sq ft (7,300 m²)
 Website: https://ivh.hrce.ca/

Island View High School opened its doors to students on September 8th 2018 after a long fight from the community for their own High School.

Parks and Recreation

Beaches
Several beaches are in the area. McCormick's Beach is located at Fisherman's Cove near the boardwalk. A salt water beach (Rainbow Haven Beach), is located towards the Cow Bay area of the community. A large serviced beach (MacDonald Beach) is located between Eastern Passage and Cole Harbour. There is also a smaller beach located down the road from MacDonald Beach.

Clubs, groups, and organizations
Hartlen Point Golf Club is also located in Eastern Passage. Opened in 1965 the club is located next to the Devils Battery which is a military complex including tunnels and bunkers.

Guides and Scouts
There are several active Scouts Canada and Girl Guides of Canada groups in Eastern Passage, such as 2nd and 3rd Eastern Passage Scouting Groups.

Sea Cadets
Eastern Passage is home to Royal Canadian Sea Cadet Corps Iroquois and 24 magnificent, recipient of the Convoy Shield for the most proficient Sea Cadet Corps in the Maritime area.

Community centres
Horizon Recreation Centre

Fields
There is a large playing field at Eastern Passage Education Centre, and numerous baseball and general purpose fields located within the vicinity of the three elementary schools.

A public tennis court is located near Seaside Elementary. The Horizon Recreation Centre (located in the Horizon Community School building) often has various activities going on year-round.

Parks
MacCormick's Beach Provincial Park
Oceanview Skate Park
Sand Key Drive Park

There are several parks and playgrounds in the area. Two playgrounds are located in the Heritage Hills subdivision (on Melrose and Serop Crescent, respectively), and there are playgrounds at Horizon, Oceanview, and Seaside schools. In August 2006, a new skateboard park opened near Seaside Elementary. Around 2016 a dirt BMX park, originally promised by at the time MLA, Becky Kent, was built.

Youth sports
Eastern Passage hosts a variety of youth sport programs that includes baseball, basketball, soccer, and softball.

Eastern Passage Tigers Basketball is a youth basketball organization dedicated to providing a safe athletic environment that focuses on the development of physical fitness, sportsmanship and team-play for children. The organization has teams for boys and girls in Steve Nash - Junior Mini (ages 8 & 9), Mini (ages 10 & 11), Bantam (ages 12 & 13), Midget (ages 14 & 15) and Juvenile (ages 16 & 17). Basketball registration begins in September and the season runs through March. Eastern Passage Tigers Basketball serves the communities of Cow Bay, Eastern Passage, and Shearwater.

United DFC was formed in 2016, when four former soccer clubs (Cole Harbour Soccer, Dartmouth F.C., Dartmouth United, and Eastern Passage Soccer) merged and created United DFC. It is organized by Soccer Nova Scotia and features both mini--and--youth leagues. Mini soccer includes Under-6, U-8 and U-10 teams, which are composed of both boys and girls. Youth soccer is divided by gender; it includes U-12, U-14, U-16 and U-18 teams. Registration for soccer starts in February and is open until June for both mini and youth leagues, and the soccer season ends in August. For years, the former Eastern Passage Soccer hosted the Dartmouth region’s year-end mini festival, which is called Soccer By The Sea.

Trails
Kinsale Court Community Path
Shearwater Flyer Trail
Tanner's Eastern Passage Trail

Demographics
Although there is not any recent information that regards population from the 2016 census, or 2021 census, there is information from the 2011 census that records 11,738 people lived within the boundaries of Eastern Passage. In 2011, the population density of the community was 855 people per km2.

Services

Water
While much of the community is serviced by municipal water, areas on the outer edges of the community require the use of well water and septic systems.

Telecommunications
All of Eastern Passage is served by Aliant (Telephone and DSL Broadband) and Eastlink (Telephone, Cable Internet access, Cable TV). The area has cellular coverage for both GSM (Rogers/Fido) and CDMA (Telus/Aliant).

Health and fitness
The Tallahassee Recreation Centre periodically offers fitness programs and includes a fitness centre for drop-in use.  Outdoor fitness equipment is also available in the adjacent park.

Public transportation
Eastern Passage is served by Halifax Transit routes 6B and 6C, which link the community to the Woodside Ferry Terminal as well as the Bridge Terminal in Dartmouth.

References

External links
Eastern Passage community website
Fisherman's Cove

Communities in Halifax, Nova Scotia
Populated coastal places in Canada